Alexander Wilson (28 July 1874 – 6 October 1932) was a New Zealand rugby union player. A forward, Wilson represented Auckland at a provincial level, and was a member of the New Zealand national side on their 1897 tour of Australia. He played eight matches on that tour including the games against Queensland and New South Wales.

Wilson died at his home in Devonport, Auckland, on 6 October 1932, and was buried at O'Neill's Point Cemetery.

References

1874 births
1932 deaths
Rugby union players from Auckland
New Zealand rugby union players
New Zealand international rugby union players
Auckland rugby union players
Rugby union forwards
Burials at O'Neill's Point Cemetery